SulAmérica is the second largest Brazilian insurance company with more than 7 million customers. The company was founded in 1895 and is controlled by the Larragoiti Family.

History 
In January 2019, SulAmérica installed vending machines selling travel insurance in the São Paulo–Guarulhos International Airport. In August 2019, SulAmérica Seguros sold its automobile insurance operations to Allianz for R$3 billion.

Description 
The company operates in the life insurance, health, automobiles, and other balance-sheet. The company's businesses are conducted through a broad and diversified distribution network, included more than 29,000 active brokers, employers, joint ventures and strategic alliances to sell its products with major financial institutions operating in Brazil, such as BV Financeira, HSBC, Santander and Banco Safra.

References 

Financial services companies of Brazil
Companies based in Rio de Janeiro (state)
Companies listed on B3 (stock exchange)
Financial services companies established in 1895
Insurance companies of Brazil
1895 establishments in Brazil